Automerina is a genus of moths in the family Saturniidae first described by Charles Duncan Michener in 1949.

Species
Automerina auletes (Herrich-Schaeffer, 1854)
Automerina beneluzi Lemaire, 2002
Automerina carina Meister, Naumann & Brechlin, 2005
Automerina caudatula (R. Felder & Rogenhofer, 1874)
Automerina cypria (Gmelin, 1790)
Automerina vala (Kirby, 1871)

References

Hemileucinae
Moth genera